Stafford Township may refer to:

Indiana

 Stafford Township, DeKalb County, Indiana
 Stafford Township, Greene County, Indiana

Kansas

 Stafford Township, Stafford County, Kansas, in Stafford County, Kansas

Minnesota

 Stafford Township, Roseau County, Minnesota

New Jersey

 Stafford Township, New Jersey

North Dakota

 Stafford Township, Renville County, North Dakota, in Renville County, North Dakota

See also

Stafford (disambiguation)

Township name disambiguation pages